A scrip (or chit in India) is any substitute for legal tender. It is often a form of credit. Scrips have been created and used for a variety of reasons, including exploitive payment of employees under truck systems; or for use in local commerce at times when regular currency was unavailable, for example in remote coal towns, military bases, ships on long voyages, or occupied countries in wartime.  Besides company scrip, other forms of scrip include land scrip, vouchers, token coins such as subway tokens, IOUs, arcade tokens and tickets, and points on some credit cards.

Scrips have gained historical importance and become a subject of study in numismatics and exonumia due to their wide variety and recurring use. Scrip behaves similarly to a currency, and as such can be used to study monetary economics.

History
A variety of forms of scrip were used at various times in the 19th and 20th centuries.

Company scrip 

Company scrip was a credit against the accrued wages of employees. 

In United States mining or logging camps where everything was owned and operated by a single company, scrip provided the workers with credit when their wages had been depleted. These remote locations were cash poor. Workers had very little choice but to purchase food and other goods at a company store. In this way, the company could charge enormous markups on goods, making workers completely dependent on the company, thus enforcing a form of loyalty to the company. Additionally, while employees could exchange scrip for cash, this could rarely be done at face value. This kind of scrip was valid only within the settlement where it was issued. While store owners in neighboring communities could accept the scrip as money, they rarely did so at face value, as it was worth less.

When U.S. President Andrew Jackson issued his Specie Circular of 1836 due to credit shortages, Virginia Scrip was accepted as payment for federal lands.

In 19th-century Western Canada, the federal government devised a system of land grants called scrip.

During the Great Depression, at the height of the crisis, many local governments paid employees in scrip. Vermilion, Alberta was just one example. 

In the U.S., payment of wages in scrip became illegal under the Fair Labor Standards Act of 1938.

The expression scrip is also used in the stock market where companies can sometimes pay dividends in the form of additional shares/stock rather than in money. It is also a written document that acknowledges debt.

After World War I and World War II, scrip was used as notgeld ("emergency money") in Germany and Austria.

Scrip was used extensively in prisoner-of-war camps during World War II, at least in countries that complied with the Third Geneva Convention. Under the Geneva Conventions, enlisted prisoners of war could be made to work and had to be paid for their labor, but not necessarily in cash. Since ordinary money could be used in escape attempts, they were given scrip that could only be used with the approval of camp authorities, usually only within the camps. 

Poker chips, also referred to as casino tokens, are commonly used as money with which to gamble. The use of chips as company money in the early 19th century in Devon, England, in the Wheal Friendship copper mine gave its name to a local village of Chipshop.

Stamp scrip 
Stamp scrip was a type of local money designed to be circulated and not to be hoarded. 

One type of this worked this way. Each scrip certificate had printed boxes; every month a stamp costing a certain amount (in a typical case, 1% of the face value) had to be purchased and recorded in a box, otherwise the scrip lost all its value. This provided a great incentive to spend the scrip quickly. The scheme was used successfully in Germany and Austria in the early 1930s, after national currencies collapsed. National governments considered themselves threatened by the success of stamp scrip projects, and shut them down; similar misgivings discouraged their later use elsewhere.

The Alberta Social Credit Party government in 1937 issued prosperity certificates, a form of provincial currency, in an effort to encourage spending. This scrip had boxes in which a stamp equal to 2% of the value had to be affixed each week. Thus, the value of the certificate was covered by the cost of the stamps at the year's end when it matured.

Modern usage
Scrip survives in modern times in various forms.

Community-issued scrip

The use of locally issued scrip accepted by multiple businesses within a community has increased during the late-2000s recession. Community-wide scrip usage has begun or is on the rise in Ithaca, New York; Detroit; The Berkshires; Pittsboro, North Carolina; Traverse City, Michigan; Lamar, Colorado; Calgary, Canada;  Bristol, UK; and Hagen, Germany.

Breadcoin scrip was created in Washington DC in 2016 to address food insecurity.

Thailand's township Amphoe Kut Chum once issued its own local scrip called Bia Kut Chum: Bia is Thai for cowry shell, which was once used as small change, and still so used in metaphorical expressions. To side-step implications that the community intended their scrip as an unlawful substitute for currency, it now issues exchange coupons called Boon Kut Chum.

Company-issued customer scrip
Some companies still issue scrip notes and token coin, good for use at company points of sale. Among these are the Canadian Tire money for the Canadian Tire stores and gasbars in Canada, and Disney Dollars (no longer printed, but still accepted), in circulation at The Magic Kingdoms and at other establishments owned and operated by The Walt Disney Company.

Scrip gift cards and gift certificates

In the retail and fundraising industries, scrip is now issued in the form of gift cards, eCards, or less commonly paper gift certificates. Physical gift cards often have a magnetic strip or optically readable bar code to facilitate redemption at the point of sale.

In the late 1980s, the term scrip evolved to include a fundraising method popular with non-profit organizations like schools, bands and athletic groups. With scrip fundraising, retailers offer the gift certificates and gift cards to non-profit organizations at a discount. The non-profit organizations sell the gift cards to member's families at full face value. The families redeem the gift cards at full face value, and the discount or rebate is retained by the non-profit organization as revenue.

Commercial gift cards

Visa, Mastercard and American Express gift cards are initially funded by a credit card or bank account, after which the funding account and gift card are not connected to one another. Once the predetermined funds are consumed, the card number expires. A gift of a gift card, maybe in an attractive wrapper, may be seen as more socially acceptable than a gift of cash. It also prevents the gift being spent on something the giver views as undesirable (or used as savings).

However, unless the gift card is obtained at a discount (paying less than the actual value of the card), buying scrip with ordinary money is arguably pointless, as it then ties up the money until it is used, and usually it may only be used at one store. Furthermore, not all gift cards issued are redeemed. In 2006, the value of unredeemed gift cards was estimated at almost US$8 billion.

Another disadvantage of gift cards is that some issuers charge "maintenance fees" on the cards, particularly if they are not used after a certain period of time; or the card will expire after a given period of time. Some provinces and states in North America (e.g. California, Ontario, Massachusetts, Ohio, Washington) have enacted laws to eliminate non-use fees or expirations, but because the laws often only apply to single-merchant cards buyers have to review the gift card conditions prior to purchase to determine exact restrictions and fees. Additionally, if a retailer goes bankrupt, gift cards can suddenly become worthless. Even if stores do not close immediately, the company may stop accepting the cards. This became a significant issue during the global financial crisis of 2008–2009, prompting the Consumers Union to call upon the Federal Trade Commission to regulate the issue.

Land scrip (United States)
Land scrip was a right to purchase federal public domain land in the United States, a common form of investment in the 19th century.  As a type of federal aid to local governments or private corporations, Congress would grant land in lieu of cash.  Most of the time the grantee did not seek to acquire any actual land but rather would sell the right to claim the land to private investors in the form of scrip.  Often the land title was finalized only after the scrip was resold several times utilizing land agents also called warrant brokers. These grants came in the form of railroad land grants, university land grants, and grants to veterans for war service.

See also

 Assignat
 Canadian Tire money
 Capitol Hill Babysitting Co-op
 Chiemgauer
 Cincinnati Time Store
 Coal Scrip
 Colonial Scrip
 Complementary currency
 Detroit Community Scrip
 Disney Dollar
 Electronic money
 Frequent-flyer program
 Gift voucher reseller
 Ithaca Hours
 Local currency
 Luncheon Voucher
 Medium of exchange
 Microsoft Points
 Military payment certificate
 Private currency
 School voucher
 Scrip of Edo period Japan
 Scrip issue
 Specie (disambiguation)
 Spintria
 Store of value
 Stored-value card
 SVM (company)
 Truck system
 Wii Point
 Virtual currency

References

External links

 Depression Scrip of the 1930s

Exonumia
Freiwirtschaft
Payment systems